Major's long-fingered bat (Miniopterus majori) is a species of vesper bat in the family Miniopteridae. It is found only in Madagascar. It is similar to M. schreibersi of continental Africa, differing by having a shorter forearm, slightly longer digits and a narrow box-shaped skull. The pelage is often a greyish-brown colour, and the tragus is kidney-shaped and is a prominent feature. It is an insectivore and is viewed as a possible contributor to pest removal in Madagascar. The species was named in honour of Swiss zoologist C. I. Forsyth Major.

References

Miniopteridae
Bats of Africa
Mammals described in 1906
Taxa named by Oldfield Thomas
Taxonomy articles created by Polbot